The San Francisco Dons women's basketball team represents the University of San Francisco in NCAA Division I women's college basketball.

History
San Francisco began play in 1976. Their first postseason appearance was in the 1980 AIAW National Division I Basketball Championship, losing 92–58 to BYU in the First Round. They made appearances in the NCAA Tournament in 1995, 1996, 1997, 2016, with a Sweet Sixteen appearance in 1996. That year, USF (ranked as a 5 seed) beat Florida 68–61, and Duke 64–60 before losing to Connecticut 72–44. They have made the WNIT three times. They played in the NCAC from 1977 to 1982 and the NORPAC from 1982 to 1985 before joining the West Coast Conference in 1985. As of the end of the 2015–16 season, the Dons have an all-time record of 546–595.

Postseason

NCAA tournament results

NIT 2002

AIAW Division I
The Dons made one appearance in the AIAW National Division I basketball tournament, with a combined record of 0–1.

AIAW Division II
The Dons made one appearance in the AIAW National Division II basketball tournament, with a combined record of 0–1.

References

External links